This is a partial list of newsgroups that are significant for their popularity or their position in Usenet history.

The Big-8 hierarchies
These are the most widely distributed and carefully controlled newsgroup hierarchies. See Big 8 (Usenet) and the Great Renaming for more information.

comp

Computer-related topics.

news
Matters related to the functioning of Usenet itself.

news.admin.net-abuse.email — discussion of abuse of email by spammers and other parties.

rec 

Recreation and entertainment topics.

 rec.arts.sf.tv.babylon5.moderated—discussion of Babylon 5 and other projects of J. Michael Straczynski.

sci

Science-related topics.

talk
Discussion of various topics, especially controversial ones. Includes political topics as well.

talk.origins — evolution-creationism controversy which maintains an extensive FAQ.

The alt hierarchy

This is the most extensive newsgroup hierarchy outside of the Big 8. Examples include:

alt.atheism — discusses atheism
alt.binaries.slack — artwork created by and for the Church of the SubGenius.
alt.config — creation of new newsgroups in the [[Alt hierarchy|alt.* hierarchy]].alt.gothic — first widespread on-line community for the goth subculture 
alt.sex — the first alt.* newsgroup for discussion of sexual topics.
alt.sex.stories — text-based erotic stories of all types.
alt.suicide.holiday — pro-choice discussion of suicide.
alt.tv.simpsons — discusses the TV show The Simpsons.

References

 
newsgroups